The Odd Get Even is the eighth studio album by new-age/jazz group Shadowfax.

Track listing 
 "Oasis" (David Lewis) - 5:07
 "One Winter Morning (Chuck Greenberg) - 4:10
 "1001 Nights" (Charles Bisharat) - 4:25
 "A Pause in the Rain" (Greenberg) - 3:53
 "Her Dress Hangs There (Stuart Nevitt, G. E. Stinson) - 5:12
 "Changing of the Guard" (Bisharat) - 3:32
 "Boomerang" (Lewis) - 4:15
 "The Odd Get Even" (Nevitt, Stinson) - 3:32
 "Sujata" (Stinson) - 5:23
 "One Heart" (Phil Maggini) - 4:13

Personnel 
 Charles Bisharat - electric MIDI violin, viola, Oberheim Matrix-1000, Kawai K1R, Yamaha TX-81Z
 David Lewis -  synclavier, Kawai K1 II, Kawai K1 R, Kawai K5, Roland Super Jupiter, Roland D-50, Roland D-550, Roland Axis, Yamaha TX802, Yamaha TX7, Yamaha DX7, E-mu Emax, Ensoniq VFX, grand piano, synthesizers
 Stuart Nevitt - drums, cymbals, ewe drums, Ensoniq EPS, DrumKAT programming; om chimes, Bushman rattles, Virginia rain shaker, tbilat, angklung, Ethiopian shaman rattles, Nigerian metal shakers, sampled tabla, udu, caxixis, bass drum
 G. E. Stinson - guitars, mbira, angklung, Moroccan tambourine, voice
 Chuck Greenberg - Lyricon, soprano saxophone, C Concert, alto and wood flutes
 Phil Maggini - electric basses, fretless bass

Additional personnel 
 John Bergamo - tabla on 1, percussion on 7
 John Bisharat - cello on 10
 Robert Margouleff, Brant Biles - recording and mixing Engineer

Charts

References

External links 
 http://www.chuckgreenberg.com/ODD%20GET%20EVEN.htm

1990 albums
Albums produced by Robert Margouleff
Shadowfax (band) albums